James Aston (1 July 1877 – February 1934) was an English professional footballer who played as an inside forward. He made 184 appearances and scored 68 goals in the Football League. He was known by the nickname of "Soldier Aston" during his playing career.

Career
He started his league career playing for Walsall, and was the club's leading goalscorer in the 1898–99 season. He was signed by Woolwich Arsenal in May 1899, making his debut on 2 September 1899 against Leicester Fosse. After playing 11 of the first 12 league games of the season and in four FA Cup ties, he lost his place to Paddy Logan in December 1899 and was unable to regain a first-team place. According to a report in the Walsall Advertiser in January 1900 Arsenal were forced into the sale of Aston, one of their "most expensive players", due to a lack of funds. In total he played 15 times for Arsenal, scoring five goals.

He moved on to Small Heath in the summer of 1900 and contributed to their promotion as Second Division runners-up in the 1900–01 season. In April 1901 Tottenham Hotspur reportedly made a move to sign Aston but he was retained by Small Heath for the following season. He went on to play for Doncaster Rovers, briefly rejoined Walsall, before signing professional terms with South Kirkby among a number of clubs prior returning to his old club Walsall once again. In November 1905 it was clear that Aston was not the force he once was, with newspaper reports pointing out that he was "long passed his best" whilst playing for Walsall.

Personal life
It appears that throughout his football career and beyond Aston had a long line of money troubles, resulting in multiple convictions. In March 1902 Aston was ordered by the court to pay towards the support of his mother. In July 1904 Aston was convicted of non payment of maintenance to his wife, Elizabeth, and sentenced to a month in prison. He claimed that he had been doing no work. His address at this point was given as 155 Whitehall Road, Walsall. In April 1906 Aston was again convicted of non payment of maintenance and sentenced to a month of hard labour. He went on record saying that he had not earned wages as he had not played football since Christmas. In April 1907 Aston once again found himself in court for non payment of maintenance arrears. Aston was by now an unemployed labourer, living at 21 Proffitt Street, Wallsall. He was sentenced to a month of hard labour. By December 1907 Aston was still not able to pay arrears and was sentenced to two months imprisonment, his address was given as Brook Yard, Proffitt Street, Walsall. By April 1908 Aston was living at James Street, Ryecroft, Walsall and found himself caught up in a midnight trespass into a fowl shed on Rushall Hall Farm. For his part in the caper Aston was sentenced to two months hard labour but his prison sentence was reduced to one month on appeal that he had never been convicted of theft previously. In November 1909 Aston was again sentenced to hard labour, this time for two months, for non payment of maintenance. By now living at 22 Market Square, Stoke, Aston was reportedly well known to the courts for his drunken behaviour.

References

1877 births
1934 deaths
Sportspeople from Walsall
English footballers
Association football inside forwards
Walsall F.C. players
Arsenal F.C. players
Birmingham City F.C. players
Doncaster Rovers F.C. players
Bilston Town F.C. players
South Kirkby Colliery F.C. players
Walsall Wood F.C. players
English Football League players